Water Stories is an album by Norwegian pianist Ketil Bjørnstad recorded in 1993 and released on the ECM label.

Reception
The Allmusic review awarded the album 3 stars.

Track listing
All compositions by Ketil Bjørnstad.

 "Glacial Reconstruction" - 6:56
 "Levels and Degrees" - 7:16
 "Surface Movements" - 4:24
 "The View I" - 5:17
 "Between Memory and Presentiment" - 4:00
 "Ten Thousand Years Later" - 7:08
 "Waterfall" - 2:10
 "Flotation and Surroundings" - 5:17
 "Riverscape" - 2:11
 "Approaching the Sea" - 4:48
 "The View II" - 4:28
 "History" - 3:47

Personnel
Ketil Bjørnstad - piano
Terje Rypdal - guitar
Bjørn Kjellemyr - bass
Jon Christensen (tracks 1-5) - drums
Per Hillestad (tracks 6-12) - drums

References

1993 albums
ECM Records albums
Ketil Bjørnstad albums
Albums produced by Manfred Eicher